Kundamundi Ka'Fiatu Hohepa "Kunda" Tom (born 14 July 1986) is a semi-professional Cook Islander footballer. He has been capped seven times by the Cook Islands, scoring once.

International career
Tom appeared six times on the Cook Islands national team, including a 2010 FIFA World Cup Qualifying match against Tuvalu in which he scored.

References

1986 births
Living people
Cook Island footballers
Association football forwards
Cook Islands international footballers
People from Mitiaro